Torvastad IL is a Norwegian sports club from the district Torvastad in Karmøy. It has sections for association football, orienteering and athletics, and was founded on 6 August 1945.

The men's football team currently resides in the Fourth Division (fifth tier), having last played in the Third Division in 2007. Before that they had a Third Division run from 2000 to 2004. Notable former players include Egil Østenstad. The women's team has existed since 1974, and young players from Torvastad who have gone on to bigger clubs include Janne Stange and Solfrid Andersen.

The orienteerer Anne Margrethe Hausken also represents the club.

External links
Official site
Club history

Football clubs in Norway
Association football clubs established in 1945
Sport in Rogaland
Athletics clubs in Norway
1945 establishments in Norway